'Rise Up' is the third studio album by Canadian rock band Art of Dying. It was released in December 11, 2015 digitally from Better Noise Records & Eleven Seven Music

Track listing

"Best Won't Do" – 3:07
"Rise Up" (featuring Dan Donegan) – 3:43
"Tear Down the Wall" – 3:04
"Eat You Alive" – 3:26
"Dead Man Walking" – 3:24
"Some Things Never Change" – 3:21
"Everything" – 3:54
"Space" – 3:22
"Raging" – 2:51
"Just for Me" – 3:29
"One Day at a Time" – 3:39
"Moth to a Flame" – 3:16
"Ubuntu" – 3:59

Personnel
 Jonny Hetherington – lead vocals 
 Jeff Brown - drums
 Cale Gontier - bass 
 Tavis Stanley - guitar

References

2015 albums
Art of Dying (band) albums
Eleven Seven Label Group albums